Dana Bérová (born 25 April 1967) is a Czech businesswoman and former government minister. She was Minister of Informatics in Jiří Paroubek's cabinet. From 2009 to 2011, Bérová featured as one of five potential investors in television show Den D, the Czech version of Dragons' Den.

References 

1967 births
Living people
Czech women in business
Czech businesspeople
21st-century Czech women politicians
Government ministers of the Czech Republic
Women government ministers of the Czech Republic
Czech television personalities
Prague University of Economics and Business alumni